Paul Street is a British television commercial and film director, best known for resurrecting Steve McQueen in the 1998 Ford Puma TV Commercial.

Career
Paul directed his first film on a super 8mm camera at 12. He fell in love with film and telling stories with a movie camera. He evolved into 16mm film and found TV commercial's a creative outlet to explore the craft of filmmaking.
At 19 he directed his first cinema commercial for Hana Watches. He then went on to shoot his first TV segment at age 21. He left South Bank University with an Art Diploma before embarking on a Film, TV, & Animation course at Croydon Technical College. He delayed an offer of an MA at the Royal College of Art to pursue his directing career, working at Central Television as a Director/Cameraman for three years.

At age 21, Paul established Streetlight Films, a London-based commercials and film development company. The company quickly gained international recognition with Paul winning Best Director and The Gold Award for BMW “Scales” at the British Film & TV Craft Awards. This and the subsequent award winning Puma spot featuring Steve McQueen firmly established Paul as a groundbreaking commercial director, both in the UK and around the world. 
Paul spent the following years shooting for brands worldwide. His clients include Sky, Ford Motor Co., Siemens, Hugo Boss, Royal Navy, Nissan, GMC, United Technology, Toshiba, US Navy, Cox Business, Royal Mail, Renault, Mercedes, Becks, VW, Spice Island, Coors, MTV, Toyota, Honda, Sprint, Michelin, Goodyear, Green King, Chevy and Hyundai.

His filmmaking has taken him around the world, experiencing the local talent of film crews from Namibia, Vancouver, Belgrade, Budapest, Milan, Los Angeles, Mexico city, Brisbane and beyond.

Paul Street currently resides between Los Angeles, London and Auckland, New Zealand. He directed the movie "Borderland" starring Bruce Dern and Peter Fonda and has recently developed Cat and Mouse, a six-part TV series set in Mexico. Paul also has additional feature film projects in development; "Felon Fund", "Devils Canyon", "Savage River", "Kayla Crow" and "Claws". His most recent project is the feature film "Safe House" to be released in 2020.

Paul is represented by Streetlight Film and Media for advertising and brand work.

In 2017 Paul established Streetlightfilm and Media, a content creation and distribution company for brands worldwide.
In 2019 Paul Directed, Wrote and Produced Safe House, a thriller set in the Joshua Tree national park.
Paul continues to work in advertising specializing in Automotive, with recent commercial work for American Airlines and VW USA.
Paul street resides in los Angeles and his latest project safe house is currently preparing for film festival screenings.

Commercials directing
Paul has directed over 200 television commercials over a period of twenty years and is a leading figure in automotive and sfx advertising moving image. In 1996 Paul shot the BMW commercial, ‘’Scales’’ which won him a prestigious ‘Best Director’ award at the British Film & TV Craft Awards. This success was repeated two years later with the multi award winning commercial posthumously featuring Steve McQueen for the launch of the Ford Puma.
The commercial has subsequently featured in several top 10 lists of great ads for both TV and cinema and is considered an industry classic.

Street has continued to work with clients such as Becks Beer, Coca-Cola, Mercedes, Royal Navy, Hugo Boss and VW: to name a few. The commercials he has worked on heavily feature a mixture of live action and groundbreaking special effects, and pioneered the use of VFX (Flame) and Video editing (Avid) on set.

Filmography

Shorts 
Inside the Wolf's Lair (1992) TV pilot
Queen of Clubs (1995)
Room 9 (2006)
The Key (2007)

Web
"Streetfighter" web film (2012) Producer

Documentary
"Psychopath" documentary (2014) Executive producer

Feature Film
"Borderland" Feature Film (2014) Director
 "Safe House" Feature Film (2019) Director/Writer/Producer

External links

Streetlight Films UK Ltd

Paul Street Official website

References

Advertising directors
British expatriates in the United States
British film directors
Living people
Year of birth missing (living people)